Larry G. Miller (born July 7, 1936) is a Cajun accordion maker from Iota, Louisiana. The brand name of his accordions are 'Bon Tee Cajun' and 'Bon Cajun'.

Biography
Miller is the son of sharecropper Abraham Miller and Algena Leger. He and his son Mike published a book in 1988 called 'You Can Play Cajun Accordion: Designed For Beginners.' Miller didn't begin to build accordions until he was 52 years old in 1988. Before he worked in primary and secondary education for 22 years. He was also one of the founders of the Cajun French Music Association. Miller retired from building accordions full-time in 2006.  His grandson Jay continues to build accordions under the brand 'Bon Cajun.' Before retiring, he'd built around 85 accordions a year and repaired around 200 in the same time.

References

1936 births
Living people
Cajun accordionists
People from Iota, Louisiana
21st-century accordionists